Soul Call is a 1967 live album by Duke Ellington and his orchestra, recorded live at the Juan-les-Pins/Antibes Jazz Festival on the Côte d'Azur. Ella Fitzgerald appeared with Ellington and his band at the same festival, and a more complete version of Ellington's appearance at the festival is documented on the 1998 album Ella and Duke at the Cote D'Azur.

Track listing
 "La Plus Belle Africaine" (Duke Ellington) – 14:00
 "West Indian Pancake" (Ellington) – 4:41
 "Soul Call" (Louie Bellson, Henry Bellson) – 3:09
 "Skin Deep" (Bellson) – 13:03
 "Jam with Sam" (Ellington) – 3:38
 "Sophisticated Lady" (Ellington, Irving Mills, Mitchell Parish) – 4:20 Bonus track on Cd reissue
 "Wings and Things" (Johnny Hodges) – 3:00 Bonus track on Cd reissue
 "The Opener" (Ellington) – 3:16 Bonus track on Cd reissue
 "Caravan" (Ellington, Mills, Juan Tizol) – 6:18 Bonus track on Cd reissue
 "Kinda Dukish"/"Rockin' in Rhythm" (Ellington)/(Harry Carney, Ellington, Mills) – 5:55 Bonus track on Cd reissue
 "Such Sweet Thunder" (Ellington, Strayhorn) – 3:36 Bonus track on Cd reissue
 "Madness in Great Ones" (Ellington, Strayhorn) – 4:42 Bonus track on Cd reissue
 "Main Stem" (Ellington) – 4:21 Bonus track on Cd reissue
 "Take the "A" Train" (Strayhorn) – 5:13 Bonus track on Cd reissue
Recorded at Juan Les Pins on July 26 (track 9), July 27 (tracks 2, 4-6, 8 & 10), July 28 (tracks 1, 3 & 11-14) and July 29 (track 7)

Personnel

Performance
 Duke Ellington - piano, leader
Cat Anderson, Mercer Ellington, Herb Jones, Cootie Williams - trumpet
Lawrence Brown, Buster Cooper - trombone
Chuck Connors - bass trombone
Johnny Hodges - alto saxophone
Russell Procope - alto saxophone, clarinet
Jimmy Hamilton - tenor saxophone, clarinet
Paul Gonsalves - tenor saxophone
Harry Carney - baritone saxophone, clarinet, bass clarinet
John Lamb - bass
Sam Woodyard - drums

References

Duke Ellington live albums
Albums produced by Norman Granz
Albums recorded at Jazz à Juan
1967 live albums
Verve Records live albums